Hate Is My God  (also known as  Hatred of God) is a 1969 Italian-German Spaghetti Western film directed by Claudio Gora.

Cast 

 Tony Kendall: "Il Nero" / Carl 
 Carlo Giordana: Vincent Kearny
 Herbert Fleischmann: Alex Carter
 Marina Berti: Blanche Durand 
 Gunther Philipp: Edward Smith 
 Venantino Venantini: Sweetley 
 Claudio Gora: Arthur Field
 Herbert Fux: Jeff
 Valerio Fioravanti: Young Vincent Kearney
 Pippo Franco: Travelling Minstrel 
 Luciano Rossi: Joe

References

External links

1969 films
West German films
Spaghetti Western films
1969 Western (genre) films
Films directed by Claudio Gora
Films with screenplays by Vincenzo Cerami
1960s Italian films